Harry Weber may refer to:

 Harry Weber (sculptor) (born 1942), American sculptor
 Harry Weber (baseball) (1862–1926), American Major League Baseball catcher